Fr. Mario León Dorado is a Spanish Roman Catholic priest, in the Oblates of Mary Immaculate. He is currently the Apostolic prefect of Western Sahara.

Early life
Mario León Dorado was born in Madrid, Spain on 17 March 1974. As he grew up, he decided that he wanted to undertake missionary work, taking his vows on 15 September 1996. He was later ordained as priest on 2 June 2001, and served for three years in the Province of Jaén in Spain, with a desire to be posted to a ministry in an Arabic region afterwards. This was following a visit to the Sahara area as a student.

Western Sahara
Upon the completion of the Jaén posting, he moved to the Sahara region and began to learn Arabic, French and English in order to better serve his parishioners. When he first arrived in the area, he was taken for a walk by Fr. Acacio Valbuena Rodríguez and told "these are your parishioners, all Muslims. Being with them is what you have to do". On 24 June 2013, he was appointed by Pope Francis as Apostolic prefect of Western Sahara, prefecture of which he had been the administrator since the resignation of Rodríguez in 2009. He took possession of the position on 29 September, at a celebration at St. Francis of Assisi Cathedral, Laayoune. Dorado is the third Apostolic prefect of the region, following Rodríguez and Félix Erviti Barcelona.

Dorado described Christians in Western Sahara as being equivalent to foreigners, since there were around 600 in a total population of around 800,000 in the country. He serves two churches; the Catheral in Laayoune and a church in Dakhla, as well as a chapel in the port of Laayoune.

References

1974 births
Catholic Church in Western Sahara
Spanish expatriates in Western Sahara
21st-century Spanish Roman Catholic priests
Place of birth missing (living people)
Living people
People from Laayoune
People from Madrid
Missionary Oblates of Mary Immaculate